Waspwinter is a 1981 role-playing game supplement published by Judges Guild for Traveller.

Contents
Waspwinter is a habitable planet which is being used as a slave labor colony by a band of alien space pirates seeking to overthrow the government of their home world.

Publication history
Waspwinter was written by Walter Bledsaw and Dorothy Bledsaw and was published in 1981 by Judges Guild as a 32-page book with a large map.

Reception
Stefan Jones reviewed Waspwinter in The Space Gamer No. 49. Jones commented that "Waspwinter is an excellent adventure for refs who don't mind having to fill out the details of the adventures they buy.  Those who want a ready-to-play situation are warned to try something else."

Review
Different Worlds #21 (June, 1982)

References

Judges Guild publications
Role-playing game supplements introduced in 1981
Traveller (role-playing game) supplements